The following deaths of notable individuals related to American television occurred in 2017.

January

February

March

April

May

June

July

August

September

October

November

December

See also
2017 in American television
Deaths in 2017

References

2017 deaths
Lists of deaths in American television
2017 in American television
Deaths in American television